Bridezilla EP is the first official release by the Australian indie band Bridezilla. It was released on 24 November 2007

Track listing
"Brown Paper Bag" - (3:06)
"Chainwork" - (4:51)
"Saint Francine" - (4:31)
"Mr. Young" - (4:35)
"Forbidden Holiday" - (3:56)

Reception
The album received mixed reviews getting a score of 3.5/5 at Sputnik Music. Alex Silveri said it was "A beautiful sprawling mix of great alternative rock that drips with potential."

References

External links
 Bridezilla's Official Website
 Bridezilla On Myspace
 Ivy League Records
 Sputnik Music Review

Bridezilla (band) EPs
2007 EPs
Ivy League Records EPs